Cynthia Cristina Ferrare (born 1950) is an American former fashion model, actress, author and talk-show host. She had lead roles in several films in the late-1960s and early-1970s, including the comedy The Impossible Years and the Western film J. W. Coop (both 1968), as well as portraying the titular character in Juan López Moctezuma's horror film Mary, Mary, Bloody Mary (1972).

In the 1980s, Ferrare transitioned from acting to hosting several television series, including The Home Show, Home & Family, and Big Bowl of Love on the Oprah Winfrey Network. She has also authored several non-fiction cooking and self-help books.

Early life
Ferrare was born in 1950 in Cleveland, Ohio, the daughter of Renata and Tavio Ferrare, a butcher. Her family is of Italian descent. She was 14 years old when her family moved to Los Angeles, California, where her beauty landed her a contract with Nina Blanchard's modeling agency.  When she was 16, she signed with 20th Century Fox film studios.

Career

Film career and television hosting

Ferrare made her feature film debut in The Impossible Years (1968) opposite David Niven, playing the daughter of a university psychology professor. This was followed by a main role in the Western drama J. W. Coop (also 1968), directed by and starring Cliff Robertson and Geraldine Page. She subsequently starred as the titular character in Juan López Moctezuma's horror film Mary, Mary, Bloody Mary (1972), portraying a vampire roving a Mexican village.

In 1975, Ferrare worked as the spokesperson for Max Factor.

Ferrare was co-host of A.M. Los Angeles on KABC-TV in 1985. She co-hosted the television series The Home Show for several months in early 1989. In 1990, Ferrare was featured in print advertising for Ultra Slim-Fast. In 1993, she was guest host for two episodes of Vicki!.

Designing
She and her mother created the Cristina Ferrare Collection, producing jewelry that in 2002 was sold in seven Neiman Marcus stores and was "beginning to pop up in specialty shops throughout the country."

Big Bowl of Love
Ferrare premiered in her new show Big Bowl of Love on Oprah Winfrey's network (OWN) on January 3, 2011 with Iron Chef Cat Cora as the show's first guest. Big Bowl of Love follows Ferrare cooking recipes alongside her friends, family, and other guests.

Home and Family Show
From November 1996 – 1998, Ferrare co-hosted Home & Family on The Family Channel; the show ended on August 14, 1998, just one day before the channel became Fox Family Channel, which included a major restructuring of the network's programing. She later co-hosted a revived version of the show from 2012-2016 with Mark Steines on its new network Hallmark Channel.

Ferrare's departure was abrupt and the audience was not given any explanation nor any notice prior to her departure. On June 21, 2016, Hallmark Channel confirmed that Ferrare would no longer co-host the show with Steines; former co-host of The View Debbie Matenopoulos was named as her replacement. In a statement via Facebook, Ferrare addressed her exit: "It's really very simple, Home and Family will have a season 5 which I am so happy for and the Network decided that they want a new co-host and that will be Debbie. She will do a great job!"

Personal life
According to Ferrare, in her book Realistically Ever After, she married a man in 1969 and annulled it six weeks later. In 1973, she married automobile executive John DeLorean. He had earlier adopted a son Zachary while single, and she also adopted him. Later they had a daughter, Kathryn. After DeLorean lost his fortune and was accused, then exonerated, of cocaine trafficking charges, Ferrare divorced him in 1985. Two weeks later, on April 21, 1985, she married entertainment industry executive Anthony Thomopoulos.

Ferrare was portrayed by Isabel Arraiza in the 2018 film Driven and by Morena Baccarin in the 2019 documentary Framing John DeLorean.

Her niece (her sister's daughter) is actress Danielle Bisutti.

Filmography

Bibliography

Notes

References

External links

 
 Ferarre With Company
 Cristina Ferarre's Big Bowl of Love at the Oprah Winfrey Network
 Ferrare's Pictorial

Actresses from Cleveland
Actresses from Los Angeles
American film actresses
American non-fiction writers
American people of Italian descent
American television talk show hosts
American women non-fiction writers
American women television presenters
Female models from Ohio
Living people
Writers from Ohio
20th-century American actresses
21st-century American women
1950 births